Juliano Cazarré (born 24 September 1980) is a Brazilian actor and writer. He appeared in more than thirty films since 2002.

Biography

Cazarré is son of the juvenile writer and journalist Lourenço Cazarré, winner of the 1998 Jabuti Award. His family moved to Brasília shortly after his birth.

He is the great-nephew of the brothers actors and voice actors Older Cazarré and Olney Cazarré.

Cazarré is graduated in performing arts at the University of Brasília (UnB).

In October 2012 Cazarré released her first book of poems called Pelas Janelas.

Personal life

At the Universidade de Brasília he met the biologist and journalist Letícia Bastos, with whom he became involved in 2009 and married at the end of 2011. They have three sons: Vicente, Inácio and Gaspar.

In March 2015, they renewed their wedding in Las Vegas.

From his interpretation of Jesus Christ in the 2019 Passion of the Christ of Nova Jerusalem in Brejo da Madre de Deus, Pernambuco, Cazarré converted to Roman Catholicism from Spiritism and in his social networks he has posted reflections and his experience of his Catholic faith.

On 29 September 2020 Juliano and Letícia performed a Roman Catholic wedding, two of their children were baptized (Vicente and Inácio) and Letícia, Vicente e Inácio made their First Communion.

Career

Juliano entered the theater participating in important plays under the direction of Hugo Rodas. Within this context, he had never thought of doing theater, nor had he been involved in workshops in the area, until the third year of secondary school, when he participated in a cultural fair at the Leonardo da Vinci school. In 1999 he took part in the Programa de Avaliação Seriada (PAS) project. Averse to the exact disciplines, he enrolled in performing arts at the suggestion of his father. He moved to São Paulo in 2007. Juliano debuted on TV in Alice, a series that HBO Brasil started showing in September 2008; he was an employee of a financial company that dreamed and managed to become a DJ. Cazarré was nominated for the best actor award at the Gramado Festival for the film Nome Próprio, in 2007. In 2008 he participated in the Marcelo D2's music video Desabafo.

In 2011 Cazarré participated in Insensato Coração where he played the role of Ismael. In 2012, he lived the illiterate Adauto in the soap opera Avenida Brasil for him Juliano received prestigious awards. In 2013 he acts in Amor à Vida as one of the main characters in the plot, alongside Paolla Oliveira and Malvino Salvador.

In 2015 Cazarré participated in A Regra do Jogo as MC Merlô, a resident of Morro da Macaca and who never left the community where he was born. In 2017, he acted in the Vade Retro series as the troubled Davi and then went on to work as a gold miner in the nine o'clock Walcyr Carrasco's soap opera, O Outro Lado do Paraíso.

Still in 2013, Juliano starred in the feature film Serra Pelada, a super production by director Heitor Dalia that reproduced the drama of the largest gold mine in the history of Brazil. The film was later transformed into a Rede Globo's super series and broadcast.

In 2016, Juliano traveled the world as the protagonist of Boi Neon, by Gabriel Mascaro. The film has won numerous awards at festivals such as Toronto, Marrakesh and Venice, yielding positive reviews from the American specialized media. The publication IndieWire published an article saying: "Cazarré is a movie star in Brazil and his authentic and unpretentious performance in Boi Neon should launch him on an international stage. Seu Iremar really looks from this world, skin made of dust and muscles of fight with the bulls. Mascaro's film is an auspicious, original and absorbing work that thrills with his look at this little-seen world and the dreamers that inhabit it." The film was still voted among the top ten in 2016 by The New York Times.

The Tribeca Film Festival wrote: "We often applaud actors for the amount of information they can convey about their characters within a given film. But if there is a unique acting style that is often undervalued in contemporary cinema, it is more likely to be Gabriel Mascaro's Boi Neon, an electric study of gender dynamics among a traveling group of rodeo hands, owes much of its power to the seductive central performance of Juliano Cazarré, who plays Iremar, a bull breeder with fashion design dreams. Cazarré reveals little more than the basic facts about his character and speaks even less throughout the film, based on his muscular physique (and the comfort he exhibits within him) to suggest a muted machismo which tightens erotic tensions and tells a subliminal story of a free and libidinal life that does not require a single word." Many other publications praised Juliano Cazarré's work for Boi Neon, such as Variety, Hollywood Reporter, The Boston Globe, Chicago Tribune, The Vienna Review and others. In 2017, Juliano was chosen Best Actor at the Grand Prix of Brazilian Cinema. In 2018, Cazarré was chosen to play Jesus in the 2019 Passion of the Christ from Nova Jerusalem in Fazenda Nova, Pernambuco.

Filmography

Television

 As a movie actor

 As a movie director

Theatre

Literature

Awards and nominations

References

External links 
Juliano Cazarré's Instagram

Juliano Cazarré
Жулиано Казарре / Juliano Cazarre
Juliano Cazarré

1980 births
Living people
Converts to Roman Catholicism from spiritism or spiritualism
Brazilian Roman Catholics
Brazilian male film actors
Brazilian male stage actors
Brazilian male television actors
People from Pelotas